Crystal Spring is a stream in Box Elder County, Utah, United States.

The spring was so named on account of crystalline rock outcroppings.

See also
List of rivers of Utah

References

Rivers of Box Elder County, Utah
Rivers of Utah